Behind the Velvet Curtain  is an album by Rebecca Pidgeon. She wrote all the songs except for a cover version of "Wouldn't It Be Nice" by the Beach Boys and "Been and Gone", which she wrote with David Mamet. Four songs appeared in the movie Redbelt, including "When You Were Mine" with backing vocals by Luciana Souza.

Track listing

Personnel
 Rebecca Pidgeon – vocals, backing vocals
 Larry Goldings – Wurlitzer electric piano
 Dean Parks – electric guitar, acoustic guitar, nylon string guitar, ukulele
 Greg Leisz – pedal steel guitar
 Willie Aron – acoustic guitar, backing vocals
 Larry Koonse – nylon string guitar
 David Piltch – bass
 Larry Klein – bass
 Jay Bellerose – drums, percussion
 Danny Frankel – drums, percussion
 Debra Dobkin – drums, percussion
 Paulinho da Costa – percussion
 Luciana Souza – backing vocals

Production
 Larry Klein – producer
 Bernie Grundman – mastering
 Helik Hadar – engineer, mixing

References

External links
Official Rebecca Pidgeon website

2008 albums
Albums produced by Larry Klein
Rebecca Pidgeon albums